Who Am I? is a 1921 American silent drama film directed by Henry Kolker and starring Claire Anderson, Gertrude Astor and Niles Welch.

Cast
 Claire Anderson as 	Ruth Burns
 Gertrude Astor as Victoria Danforth
 Niles Welch as Jimmy Weaver
 George Periolat as John Collins
 Josef Swickard as Jacques Marbot
 Otto Hoffman as William Zoltz

References

Bibliography
 Connelly, Robert B. The Silents: Silent Feature Films, 1910-36, Volume 40, Issue 2. December Press, 1998.
 Munden, Kenneth White. The American Film Institute Catalog of Motion Pictures Produced in the United States, Part 1. University of California Press, 1997.

External links
 

1921 films
1921 drama films
1920s English-language films
American silent feature films
Silent American drama films
American black-and-white films
Films directed by Henry Kolker
Selznick Pictures films
1920s American films